Agriphila brioniellus is a species of moth in the family Crambidae described by Hans Zerny in 1914. It is found in Spain, France, Italy, Croatia, Hungary, Slovakia, Ukraine, Romania, Bulgaria, the Republic of Macedonia, Albania, Turkey, Transcaucasia and Iraq.

The length of the forewings is 9–11 mm.

Subspecies
Agriphila brioniellus brioniellus (Europe, Asia Minor, Transcaucasia)
Agriphila brioniellus subrioniella Bleszynski, 1959 (Iraq)

References

Moths described in 1914
Crambini
Moths of Europe
Moths of Asia